Fenyang, formerly as Fenyang County before 1996, is a county-level city under the administration of Lüliang prefecture-level city, in Shanxi Province, China.

Fenyang is located in the wide valley of the Fen River, some 20-plus kilometers west of the actual river.

Fenyang was the birthplace of Jia Zhangke, who filmed 1997 Xiao Wu there. Platform is set from the end of the 1970s to the beginning of the 1990s in and around Fenyang. Subsequently, Mountains May Depart features scenes set in Fenyang in 1999 and 2014. Fengyang is also the birthplace of Guo Qinglan, (the widow of Dwarkanath Kotnis.

Fenyang has a strong reputation within Shanxi for the production of Fenjiu, a type of Baijiu known for its superior flavor.

Climate

Transportation 
G20 Qingdao–Yinchuan Expressway
Taiyuan-Zhongwei-Yinchuan Railway

External links
 Fenyang government website (in Chinese)

Notes

Cities in Shanxi
County-level divisions of Shanxi